The Grim Adventures of Billy & Mandy is an American animated television series created by Maxwell Atoms for Cartoon Network and distributed by Warner Bros. Domestic Television Distribution. It follows Billy, an extremely dimwitted, happy-go-lucky boy, and Mandy, a cynical, remorseless girl, who, after winning a limbo game to save Billy's pet hamster, gain Grim, the mighty Grim Reaper, as their "best friend forever". Grim, who is reluctant to serve the two children, has access to supernatural items, spells, and other abilities that often lead Billy and Mandy to interact with otherworldly environments, characters, or situations.

Billy & Mandy began as a series of segments on Grim & Evil, from which it was a spin-off, along with sister series Evil Con Carne, on August 24, 2001. Although the 2003-2004 episodes were produced for Grim & Evil, the show ran as a separate series from June 13, 2003, to November 9, 2007, on Cartoon Network. Two made-for-TV movies were also produced, Billy & Mandy's Big Boogey Adventure, which aired on March 30, 2007, and Billy & Mandy: Wrath of the Spider Queen, which aired on July 6, 2007. A crossover special with fellow Cartoon Network series, Codename: Kids Next Door, entitled "The Grim Adventures of the KND", aired on November 11, 2007. One more made-for-TV movie, Underfist: Halloween Bash, intended to serve as a pilot for a new spin-off series, aired on October 12, 2008.

During its run, the series won two Emmy Awards and one Annie Award, with nominations for one Daytime Emmy Award, three Golden Reel Awards, and two other Annie Awards. Billy & Mandy has also been made into a video game as well as various licensed merchandise.

Premise 

The series is centered around the exploits of Billy (Richard Steven Horvitz), an idiotic and happy-go-lucky boy; Mandy (Grey DeLisle), a cynical and cold-hearted girl; and Grim (Greg Eagles), a Jamaican-accented Reaper. After Billy and Mandy cheated at a limbo match against Grim (in retaliation for putting the limbo rod too low for them to go under), he is enslaved in a permanently unwanted friendship with the children. Grim is miserable in the first days of his servitude, and even fantasizes about killing them multiple times. However, as the time passes, he gradually adapts to the new life, and even grows to care for Billy and Mandy, if only somewhat. Despite this, he retains a love–hate relationship with the two and desires to eventually break free from his servitude. 

Billy and Mandy use Grim's supernatural abilities and powers to venture into supernatural locations or environments, such as the Underworld, or the Netherworld, inhabited by an assortment of grotesque monstrous beasts. The pair also use Grim's enormously strong supernatural abilities or ties with a number of beastly characters to achieve goals or desires for themselves, often with twisted results. Famed fictional monsters including Dracula, the Wolfman, and the bogeyman are also comically depicted in the series.

Supporting characters include Irwin (Vanessa Marshall), Billy's nerdy best friend who has a crush on Mandy; Harold (Richard Steven Horvitz), Billy's father who shares his son's stupidity; Gladys (Jennifer Hale), Billy's loving yet mentally unstable mother; Mindy (Rachael MacFarlane), the snobby, stuck-up, and spoiled queen bee of Billy and Mandy's school; Sperg (Greg Eagles), the local bully who has a sensitive side; Hoss Delgado (Diedrich Bader), an overly-intense "spectral exterminator" who hunts supernatural creatures; Nergal (David Warner/Martin Jarvis), a friendship-seeking demon who later marries Billy's aunt and bears a son, Nergal Jr. (Debi Derryberry); General Skarr (Armin Shimerman), Billy's ill-tempered next door neighbor who originated in the Evil Con Carne animated series; and Jeff (Maxwell Atoms), a giant spider constantly trying to win the approval of the arachnophobic Billy, whom he sees as his father.

The show lacks continuity for the most part, as many episodes end with characters killed, exiled, or stuck in a situation. Characters sometimes display an awareness of some events from previous episodes, but there are no clear character arcs or coherent plot lines tying the show together.

Cast

Main cast 
 Richard Steven Horvitz as Billy, Harold (Billy's father), Saliva (Mandy's pet dog)
 Grey DeLisle as Mandy, Aunt Sis (Billy's aunt), Milkshakes (Billy's pet cat)
 Greg Eagles as Grim, Sperg
 Vanessa Marshall as Irwin, Claire (Mandy's mother)

Recurring cast 
 Jennifer Hale as Gladys (Billy's mother)
 Jane Carr as Pud'n
 Rachael MacFarlane as Mindy, Eris
 Phil LaMarr as Dracula; Grandmama; Judge Roy Spleen
 Dee Bradley Baker as Phillip (Mandy's father)
 Armin Shimerman as General Skarr
 Diedrich Bader as Hoss Delgado
 Maxwell Atoms as Jeff the Spider
 David Warner as Nergal (2001–2002)
 Martin Jarvis as Nergal (2003–2008)
 Debi Derryberry as Nergal Jr.
 Chris Cox as Principal Goodvibes
 Renee Raudman as Ms. Butterbean
 Fred Willard as Boogeyman
 C. H. Greenblatt as Fred Fredburger

Episodes

Production history 
The series had its genesis in 1995, when Maxwell Atoms, while he was a junior at the University of the Arts in Philadelphia, made a two-minute short film for his thesis project. Titled Billy and Mandy in: The Trepanation of the Skull and You, it centers around Billy and Mandy (prototype versions) discussing trepanning with each other. In the end, Mandy drills Billy's head, causing him to pass out after too much blood loss even though he says he feels great. The short had never been shown publicly until April 30, 2016, during the first annual TromAnimation Film Festival. After the screening, Atoms uploaded the film to his YouTube channel, albeit in a deteriorating state after years of storage.

While working on the first season of Cow and Chicken, Atoms was approached by Hanna-Barbera executives for ideas for new short films. Among the ideas he presented to Hanna-Barbera was "Milkman", centering on an anthropomorphic, superhero milk carton who saves the missing children depicted on his back. Though the idea was rejected, executives were interested in Billy and Mandy, two characters that were to be featured in the project. Atoms was prompted to devise a series centering on the two children. Feeling that the characters Billy and Mandy would not be enough to carry a show, he began devising a third character to round out the main cast. He was always fascinated by the idea of a little girl befriending the Devil or the grim reaper, but eventually settled on the latter, as Cartoon Network did not approve of depictions of the devil after Cow and Chicken. Atoms pitched the Billy & Mandy concept to Cartoon Network and Nickelodeon, to which Cartoon Network approved the production of a short film 6 months later (which would become the short/pilot Meet the Reaper).

The show was put into full production after the result of a viewer poll event by way of telephone and the Internet called Cartoon Network's Big Pick which was held from June 16 to August 25, 2000. The three final choices were The Grim Adventures of Billy & Mandy, Whatever Happened to... Robot Jones?, and Longhair and Doubledome. Out of the three, Billy & Mandy attained the most votes with 57%; Robot Jones came in second place at 23% while Longhair and Doubledome received 20% of the vote.

Originally part of Grim & Evil, Billy & Mandy served as the main show. In each episode, an Evil Con Carne short was put between two Grim shorts. An original Evil Con Carne short was produced in 2000 after Meet the Reaper, but Cartoon Network wanted to combine the series, to have a "B cartoon" as a middle segment (similar to the Dial M For Monkey and The Justice Friends shorts in Dexter's Laboratory, or the I Am Weasel segment on Cow and Chicken). On occasion, it was the other way around, with two Evil shorts and one Grim short. The series premiered on August 24, 2001, during the Cartoon Cartoon Fridays Big Pick Weekend.

Another batch of 13 half-hour episodes were produced for Grim & Evil, but on June 13, 2003, the network separated the two segments and gave each their own half-hour program. The split came as a result of Cartoon Network wanting to move away from the old 7 minute segment format, and focus on two 11 minute segments per half hour instead. After both series aired their respective new seasons, the network gave Atoms a decision to continue one series, while the other would be dropped from production. Atoms opted to continue Billy & Mandy and accepted the network's decision, as he considered running both shows stressful. Evil Con Carne characters occasionally appear on The Grim Adventures of Billy & Mandy. General Skarr was introduced into the show as a recurring character beginning in Season 2's "Skarred for Life", where he became Billy's new next-door neighbor. In "Company Halt", the ninth episode of the final season which also functions as the true series finale for Evil Con Carne, Ghastly, Hector, Boskov, and Stomach restart their evil organization and convince Skarr to rejoin them, but their plans are ultimately foiled by Billy and Mandy, and Skarr goes back to living his life as a normal person.

On March 20, 2022, Craig McCracken revealed that years ago on Cartoon Network there were plans for a spinoff series titled Cheeseburger featuring Fred Fredburger and Cheese from Foster's Home for Imaginary Friends, but the idea never gained traction.

Atoms confirmed in 2021 that the three main characters of the show are on the autism spectrum, having been diagnosed with Asperger syndrome late in life. He likened Mandy to "the cold, rational way [he] learned to view the world in order to survive", Billy to "the fun and joyous inner-world where [Atoms likes] to spend [his] time" and Grim to "the moral mediator between the two."

Reception 
Common Sense Media gave the show a 3/5 star rating and stated that it has "goofy punchlines and obscure cultural references" and recommends the viewer age be at least 8 years old.

Awards and nominations 
The series has won one Annie Award and two Emmy Awards and has been nominated nine times for various awards.

TV movies 

Three TV movies were made for the series. The first one was called Billy & Mandy's Big Boogey Adventure and was released on DVD in April, 2007.

A second movie, Wrath of the Spider Queen, was also released in 2007. It was based on a spider queen from Grim's distant past, who tries to take revenge on him because she was meant to be the reaper. Meanwhile, keeping up with the spider theme, Billy learns to love his spider son Jeff.

On October 12, 2008, a third and final spin-off movie, titled Underfist: Halloween Bash, premiered on Cartoon Network. The movie's primary focus is on Irwin, Jeff the Spider, Hoss Delgado, General Skarr, and Fred Fredburger accidentally coming together to defeat an invasion of chocolate bar monsters, led by an evil marshmallow bunny, on Halloween night.

Media

Music 
The score composers for the series are Gregory Hinde, Drew Neumann and Guy Moon. In addition, two songs were made for the show by Aurelio Voltaire, the episode "Little Rock of Horrors", which parodies the musical Little Shop of Horrors, features a song titled "BRAINS!" and, in Billy & Mandy's Big Boogey Adventure, the song "Land of the Dead" is played in the opening credits. Both songs are a part of the album Spooky Songs For Creepy Kids. The season two episode "Battle of the Bands" also featured the song "Darkness" by gothic industrial rock band SPF-1000. The end credits music of "Billy & Mandy Save Christmas" is the song "Round and Round" by glam metal band Ratt.

Video games 

Midway Games published two video games based on the series in 2006, each featuring the same plot but different gameplay. The first, a 3D fighting game, was developed by High Voltage Studios and released on September 25, 2006, for the PlayStation 2 and GameCube, and on November 19, 2006, in North America for the Wii. The second, a sidescrolling beat 'em up, was developed by Full Fat and released on October 31, 2006, for the Game Boy Advance. Characters from the series have also appeared in Cartoon Network crossover video games, such as FusionFall and Cartoon Network: Punch Time Explosion.

Home media 

The first season was first released on DVD by Warner Home Video on September 18, 2007. Collection 2 released February 11, 2010, in Australia and New Zealand and contains the next 13 episodes in the series.

The entire series is available on iTunes and Amazon Prime in six volumes, with the exceptions of Billy & Mandy Save Christmas, Billy & Mandy's Big Boogey Adventure and Underfist: Halloween Bash.

On January 1, 2021, The Grim Adventures of Billy & Mandy was added to HBO Max.

Notes

References

External links 

 
 
  Archived from the original on September 1, 2016.

 
2000s American animated television series
2000s American black comedy television series
2000s American children's comedy television series
2000s American horror television series
2001 American television series debuts
2007 American television series endings
American animated television spin-offs
American children's animated comedy television series
American children's animated fantasy television series
American children's animated horror television series
American children's animated supernatural television series
Animated television series about children
Cartoon Cartoons
Cartoon Network original programming
Television series by Cartoon Network Studios
Classical mythology in popular culture
Elementary school television series
English-language television shows
Gothic television shows
Television series about personifications of death
Television series created by Maxwell Atoms
Television shows set in the United States
Autism in television